BR-135 is a federal highway of Brazil. The 2518 kilometre road connects São Luís to Belo Horizonte.

The road passes through the MATOPIBA region (in the south of Maranhão and Piauí and in the west of Bahia), which is an important producer of soy, corn and cotton, among others products; and Minas Gerais, which is the largest Brazilian producer of minerals and gemstones, in addition to having a strong agricultural sector.

References 

Federal highways in Brazil